Fulbaria is an upazila of the Mymensingh District in Bangladesh.

History
According to archaeologists, most of the Fulbaria is an extended part of the land formed by the red soil of Madhupur and Bhawal; one of the oldest soils in the country. The southern and south-western and south-eastern parts of Phulbaria are composed of red soil. The north-western and north-eastern parts are composed mainly of ancient silt and loam soils.

Fulbaria was formerly known as Govindaganj. The use of phulkhari (a type of chalk) was very prevalent in the area from which the modern name is said to have come from. In 1864, Govindaganj was renamed to Fulbaria and administratively established as a thana. However, due to the influence and power of some people, the boundaries could not be determined. The boundaries were demarcated and the thana was officially established in 1867.

During the Bangladesh Liberation War of 1971, a training camp for Bengali freedom fighters was founded in Kandania-Langal Shimul Bazar(Kandania High School Field) in Bhabanipur on 25 March. In Lakshmipur, a fierce face-off took place between the freedom fighters and the Pakistan Army resulting in 70 total deaths. On 8 December of the same year, Fulbaria was liberated. During a cyclone on 27 April 1972, many areas in Fulbaria were affected such as Bakta, Achim Patuli, Naogaon and Putijana in addition to seven deaths and many wounded. The Fulbaria thana was upgraded to an upazila (sub-district) on 2 July 1983. In 1998, the Keshoreganj College was founded.

Geography
Fulbaria upazila with an area of 402.41 km2, is bounded by Muktagachha upazila on the north, Bhaluka upazila on the south, Trishal and Mymensingh sadar upazilas on the east, ghatail, madhupur and Muktagachha upazilas on the west. Main rivers are Khiru, Nageshwari, banar and Bajua; main beel  is Bhawal.

Demographics
According to the 2011 Bangladesh census, Fulbaria had a population of 448,467. Males constituted 49.70% of the population and females 50.30%. Muslims formed 97.25% of the population, Hindus 2.48%, Christians 0.23% and others 0.04%. Fulbaria had a literacy rate of 42.34% for the population 7 years and above.

Majority of the population are Bengalis but the upazila is also home to Garos and the Koch.

As of the 1991 Bangladesh census, Fulbari has a population of 345,283. Males constitute 50.77% of the population, and females 49.23%. This Upazila's eighteen up population is 171,551. Fulbaria has an average literacy rate of 20.6% (7+ years), and the national average of 32.4% literate.

Fulbaria (Town) consists of five mouzas. The area of the town is 42.4 km2. It has a population of 53412; male 51.22%, female 48.78%; population density per km2 is 1259. Literacy rate among the town people is 25.23%. The town has one dakbungalow.

Administration
Fulbaria thana, now an upazila, was established in 1867.

Fulbaria Upazila is divided into Fulbaria Municipality and 13 union parishads: Asim-Patuli, Balian, Bakta, Vobanipur, Deukhola, Enayetpur, Fulbaria, Kaladaha, Kushmail, Naogaon, Putijana, Radhakanai, and Rangamatia. The union parishads are subdivided into 104 mauzas and 116 villages.           

Fulbaria Municipality is subdivided into 9 wards and 11 mahallas.

Education

Literacy and educational institutions average literacy 75.02%; male 62%, female 38.04%. Educational institutions: college 12, high school 47, madrasa 52, government primary school 104, non-government primary school 63. Noted educational institutions:  Fulbaria College, Shahabuddin Degree College, Fulbaria Pilot High School, Asim High School, Hare Krishna Union High School Asim ideal High school, Kushmail Union Badar Uddin High School, Radhakanai high school, Palashihata school and college, Shapla girls school and college, Bakta High School, Alhaz Mobarok Khan College, Janata College, Naogao College, Islamia College, Fulbaria K.I Senior Fazil Madrasha, Biddyananda Collegiate Madrasha, Akhter Sultana Mohila College, Muhammad Nagar High School, Kandania High School, Babuganj High School, Putijana High School, Fulbaria High School, shibrampur high school and Al-Hera Academy .

Economy and tourism
Fulbaria is noted for its beels as well as the large forest area in Rangamatia and Santoshpur. The latter Union is also home to Rubber plantation.

See also
Shahabuddin Degree College
Upazilas of Bangladesh
Districts of Bangladesh
Divisions of Bangladesh

References

Upazilas of Mymensingh District